Overyata is an urban locality (an urban-type settlement) under the administrative jurisdiction of the Town of Krasnokamsk in Perm Krai, Russia, located  west of Perm. Population:

History
It was founded as a railway platform. In 1953, a reinforced concrete structures factory (known as JSC "Permtranszhelezobeton" since 1993) was built. Also in 1953, a brickyard was built. Urban-type settlement status was granted to Overyata in 1962.

References

Urban-type settlements in Perm Krai